Glen Moray distillery  is a Speyside distillery producing single malt scotch whisky. Situated on the banks of the River Lossie in Elgin, Moray the distillery started production in September 1897.  It was sold in 2008 by the Glenmorangie Company Ltd. to La Martiniquaise.

History

Glen Moray started life as West Brewery in Elgin run by Robert Thorne & Sons, and was converted to a distillery with 2 stills in 1897. Following a fire and extensive rebuilding program at their Aberlour Distillery, the company focused on production of Aberlour whisky, allowing the Glen Moray distillery to run down. It was closed in 1910. The distillery was purchased by the owners of the Glenmorangie Distillery, the MacDonald and Muir families at some time during the 1920s. The distillery received 2 additional stills in 1958 and at present has an annual capacity of around 2,000,000 litres.

The company now belongs to La Martiniquaise which uses part of its production in their blended Whisky Cutty Sark and Label 5, along with its Starlaw distillery in West Lothian. The distillery was expanded in 2012 to produce 3,300,000 litres annually from 3 wash stills and 3 spirit stills. 2016 has seen further expansion and development of the site with a growth in production to around 5,500,000 litres annually predicted.

Visitor centre 
The distillery has a visitor centre which offers tours and tastings year-round. Details can be found on the company website here: Distillery ToursScotland's Malt Whisky Trail is a tourism initiative featuring seven working Speyside distilleries including Glen Moray, a historic distillery (Dallas Dhu, now a museum) and the Speyside Cooperage.

Awards and accolades 
Glen Moray has won many awards over the years through competitions such as the IWSC, ISC, WWA and others.

Glen Moray 1994 Sherry Cask Finish is the Best Scotch Speyside Single Cask Single Malt Category Winner of 21 & over in the World Whiskies Awards 2018.

References

Further reading

External links 
 

Distilleries in Scotland
Scottish malt whisky
1897 establishments in Scotland
Glen Moray Glenlivet Distillery, The
LVMH brands